Leucothoe axillaris is a shrub native to the southeastern United States, with the common names swamp dog-laurel and coastal dog-hobble. It has been reported from Louisiana, Mississippi, Alabama, Florida, Georgia, North and South Carolina and Virginia.

Fruit is a dry capsule.

The cultivar  = 'Zeblid' has won the Royal Horticultural Society's Award of Garden Merit.

References

Vaccinioideae
Flora of the Southeastern United States
Flora of the Appalachian Mountains
Flora without expected TNC conservation status